Selsertown is an extinct town in Adams County, Mississippi, United States.

A Plaquemine culture platform mound is located there, once known as the Selsertown Mound but currently known as Emerald Mound. It once had a total of six to eight mounds on its summit but only the two on the ends have survived. It was described as being of "extraordinary size" in the 1848 book Ancient Monuments of the Mississippi Valley and it is the second-largest Pre-Columbian earthwork in the United States, after Monk's Mound at Cahokia, Illinois. The mound dates from the period between 1200 and 1730 CE and is the type site for the Emerald Phase (1500 to 1680 CE) of the Natchez Bluffs Plaquemine culture chronology. It was still in use by their descendants, the historic era Natchez people, as their main ceremonial center. Emerald was abandoned by the time of the French colonial period, and the hereditary chief of the Natchez had his capital at the nearby Grand Village Site. This settlement was one of the last active expressions of the platform mound building culture along the Mississippi River.

Selsertown was the third stop on the Old Natchez Road.  Beginning in Natchez, the road traveled northeast through Washington, Selsertown, Uniontown, and many other communities until it ended in Nashville, Tennessee.  The United States required jurisdictions through which the Trace passed to commit to development of a tavern or inn every six miles on the trace. George Selser built an inn at this site, which opened in 1780. John McCullum eventually became the owner of the inn. A sign outside of the inn, while owned by McCullum, read "Intertainment for Man and Baste." The inn caught fire and was destroyed during the American Civil War.

References

External links
Map from 1836 showing the location of Selsertown

Natchez Trace
Former populated places in Adams County, Mississippi
Former populated places in Mississippi